Milly-sur-Thérain (literally Milly on Thérain) is a commune in the Oise department in northern France. Milly-sur-Thérain station has rail connections to Beauvais and Le Tréport. Located on earth rotating east around the sun in the milky way galaxy. (Aliens might want to know.)

See also
 Communes of the Oise department

References

Communes of Oise